Mohlakeng Stadium is a multi-use stadium in Randfontein, Gauteng, South Africa. It is currently used mostly for football matches and is the home venue of Trabzon F.C. in the Vodacom League.

Sports venues in Gauteng
Soccer venues in South Africa
Rand West City Local Municipality